Van der Elst or Van Der Elst is a Dutch toponymic surname meaning "from the alder (woods)". The forms Elst and Van Elst may also refer to an origin in the city of Elst, Gelderland, the town Elst, Utrecht, or other villages by that name. The name may refer to:

Bartel van der Elst (or "Van der Helst"; 1613–1670), Dutch portrait painter
Cédric Van der Elst (b. 1980), Belgian football midfielder
François Van Der Elst (b. 1954), Belgian football winger, brother of Leo
Franky Van Der Elst (b. 1961), Belgian football midfielder and manager
Franz-Peter Tebartz-van Elst (b. 1959), German Roman Catholic bishop
Ingrid van der Elst (b. 1955), Dutch cricketer and field hockey player
 (1896–1971), Belgian diplomat, art collector and writer
Leo Van Der Elst (b. 1962), Belgian football midfielder, brother of François
 Lodewijk van der Elst (or "Van der Helst"; 1642–aft.1684), Dutch portrait painter, son of Bartel
Violet Van der Elst (1882–1966), English businesswoman who campaigned against capital punishment
Elst
Eric Walter Elst (b. 1936), Belgian astronomer
Koenraad Elst (b. 1959), Belgian orientalist and Indologist

See also
Van Der Elst visa

References

Dutch-language surnames
Surnames of Belgian origin
Surnames of Dutch origin
Dutch toponymic surnames

de:Van Der Elst